Dera Ismail Khan Airport or D. I. Khan Airport  is situated 10 km away from the city centre of Dera Ismail Khan, a city in Khyber-Pakhtunkhwa province of Pakistan. The airport is the only airport besides Bannu Airport that connects the southern districts of Khyber-Pakhtunkhwa with other parts of the country.Now airport off without any reason.

History 
Dera Ismail Khan airport was closed following the start of the Afghan-US war in 2001 for unspecified reasons. After a total of six years the airport was decided to reopen after a delegation of the district visited Islamabad. The reopening was stated to cost around Rs4 million, which was spent on repairing the runway and on the renovation and repair of the terminal building. Pakistan International Airlines (PIA) was the sole operator at the airport, providing feeder services between Peshawar, Zhob, Multan, Lahore and Islamabad using Fokker F-27 aircraft. With the reopening plans, the CAA has decided to upgrade the airport which would eventually facilitate the initiation of international flights for the people of the area working abroad and in the business community. The first flight is expected to be launched on the 27 October 2008 to Islamabad via Peshawar.

Structure 

Dera Ismail Khan airport is not as large as the other airports in Pakistan, as it caters mainly to the population of Dera Ismail Khan. The airport is only for smaller aircraft such as Fokker and ATRs. The airport is currently not able to handle larger aircraft such as Boeing and Airbus. There is currently one runway denoted 12 and 30.
It is near Chashma road. Chashma road starts from Sheikh Yousif Chowk towards Kokar, Paharpur, Bilot Sharif and approximately 80 kilometers to Chashma Atomic Plant near Mianwali.

Airlines and destinations 
There are currently no airlines serving the airport.

See also 
 List of airports in Pakistan
 Airlines of Pakistan
 Transport in Pakistan
 Pakistan Civil Aviation Authority

References

External links
 

Airports in Khyber Pakhtunkhwa
Dera Ismail Khan District